Rameez Junaid and Philipp Marx were the defending champions, but only Marx played this year.
Marx and Sebastian Rieschick were eliminated by Jesse Huta Galung and Igor Sijsling in the quarterfinals.
Jonathan Marray and Jamie Murray won in the final 6–1, 6–4, against Sergei Bubka and Sergiy Stakhovsky.

Seeds

Draw

Draw

References
 Doubles Draw

TEAN International - Doubles
TEAN International